The Danish West Indies or Danish Antilles or Danish Virgin Islands were a Danish colony in the Caribbean, consisting of the islands of Saint Thomas with ; Saint John with ; and Saint Croix with . The islands have belonged to the United States since they were purchased in 1917. Water Island was part of the Danish West Indies until 1905, when the Danish state sold it to the East Asiatic Company, a private shipping company.

The Danish West India-Guinea Company annexed uninhabited St. Thomas
in 1672; annexed St. John in 1718; and bought St. Croix from France (King Louis XIV) on June 28, 1733.  When the Danish West India-Guinea Company went bankrupt in 1754, King Frederik V of Denmark–Norway assumed direct control of the three islands. Britain occupied the Danish West Indies in 1801–02 and 1807–15 during the Napoleonic Wars.

Danish colonizers in the West Indies aimed to exploit the profitable triangular trade, involving the export of firearms and other manufactured goods to Africa in exchange for slaves, who were then transported to the Caribbean to work the sugar plantations.
Caribbean colonies, in turn, exported sugar, rum and molasses to Denmark. The economy of the Danish West Indies depended on slavery. After a rebellion, slavery was officially abolished in 1848, leading to the near economic collapse of the plantations.

In 1852, the Danish parliament first debated the sale of the increasingly unprofitable colony. Denmark tried several times to sell or exchange the Danish West Indies in the late 19th and early 20th centuries: to the United States and to the German Empire, respectively. The islands were eventually sold to the United States for $25 million which took over the administration on 31 March 1917 and renamed the territory the United States Virgin Islands.

History

Foundation

Merchants in Copenhagen asked King Christian IV for permission to establish a West Indian trading company in 1622, but, by the time an eight-year monopoly on trade with the West Indies, Virginia, Brazil and Guinea was granted on 25 January 1625, the failure of the Danish East India and Iceland Companies and the beginning of Danish involvement in the Thirty Years' War dried up any interest in the idea. Prince Frederick organized a trading mission to Barbados in 1647 under Gabriel Gomez and the de Casseres brothers, but it and a 1651 expedition of two ships were unsuccessful. It was not until Erik Smit's private 1652 expedition aboard the Fortuna was successful that interest in the West Indies' trade grew into an interest in the creation of a new Danish colony.

Smit's 1653 expedition and a separate expedition of five ships were quite successful, but Smit's third expedition found his two vessels captured for a loss of 32,000 rigsdaler. Two years later, a Danish flotilla was destroyed by a hurricane in August. Smit returned from his fourth expedition in 1663 and formally proposed the settlement of St. Thomas to the king in April 1665. After only three weeks' deliberation, the scheme was approved and Smit was named governor. Settlers departed aboard the Eendragt on 1 July, but the expedition was ill-starred: The ship hit two large storms and suffered from fire before reaching its destination, and then it was raided by English privateers prosecuting the Second Anglo-Dutch War, in which Denmark was allied with the Netherlands. Smit died of illness, and a second band of privateers stole the ship and used it to trade with neighboring islands. Following a hurricane and a renewed outbreak of disease, the colony collapsed, with the English departing for the nearby French colony on Saint Croix, the Danes fleeing to Saint Christopher, and the Dutch assisting their countrymen on Ter Tholen in stealing everything of value, particularly the remaining Danish guns and ammunition.

Danish West India Company

The Danes formed a Board of Trade in 1668 and secured a commercial treaty with Britain, providing for the unmolested settlement of uninhabited islands, in July 1670. The Danish West India Company was organized in December and formally chartered by King Christian V the next year on 11 March 1671. Jørgen Iversen Dyppel, a successful trader on Saint Christopher, was made governor and the king provided convicts from his jails and two vessels for the establishment of the colony, the yacht Den forgyldte Krone and the frigate Færøe. Den forgyldte Krone was ordered to run ahead and wait but ended up returning to Denmark after the Færøe under Capt. Zacharias Hansen Bang was delayed for repairs in Bergen. The Færøe completed her mission alone, establishing a settlement on St. Thomas on 25 May 1672. From an original contingent of 190 12 officials, 116 company "employees" (indentured servants), and 62 felons and former prostitutes only 104 remained, 9 having escaped and 77 having died in transit. Another 75 died within the first year, leaving only 29 to carry on the colony.

In 1675, Iversen claimed St. John and placed two men there; in 1684, Governor Esmit granted it to two English merchants from Barbados but their men were chased off the island by two British sloops sent by Governor Stapleton of the British Leeward Islands. Further instructions in 1688 to establish a settlement on St. John seem not to have been acted on until Governor Bredal made an official establishment on 25 March 1718.

The islands quickly became a base for pirates attacking ships in the vicinity and also for the Brandenburg African Company. Governor Lorentz raised enormous taxes upon them and seized warehouses and cargoes of tobacco, sugar, and slaves in 1689 only to have his actions repudiated by the authorities in Copenhagen; his hasty action to seize Crab Island prohibited the Brandenburgers from establishing their own Caribbean colony, however. Possession of the island was subsequently disputed with the Scottish in 1698 and fully lost to the Spanish in 1811.

St. Croix was purchased from the French West India Company in 1733. In 1754, the islands were sold to the Danish king, Frederick V of Denmark, becoming royal Danish colonies.

Later history (1801–1917)

The first British invasion and occupation of the Danish West Indies occurred during the French Revolutionary Wars, when at the end of March 1801 a British fleet arrived at St Thomas. The Danes accepted the Articles of Capitulation the British proposed and the British occupied the islands without a shot being fired. The British occupation lasted until April 1802, when the British returned the islands to Denmark.

The second British invasion of the Danish West Indies took place during the Napoleonic Wars in December 1807 when a British fleet captured St Thomas on 22 December and Saint Croix on 25 December. The Danes did not resist and the invasion was bloodless. This British occupation of the Danish West Indies lasted until 20 November 1815, when Britain returned the islands to Denmark.

By the 1850s, the Danish West Indies had a total population of about 41,000 people. The government of the islands was under a governor-general, whose jurisdiction extended to the other Danish colonies of the group.  However, because the islands formerly belonged to Great Britain, the inhabitants were English in customs and in language. The islands of that period consisted of:

 St. Thomas had a population of 12,800 people and had sugar and cotton as its chief exports. St. Thomas city was the capital of the island, then a free port, and the chief station of the steam-packets between Southampton, in England, and the West Indies.
 St. John had a population of about 2,600 people.
 St. Croix, though inferior to St. Thomas in commerce, was of greater importance in extent and fertility, and, with 25,600 people, was the largest in population.

In 1916, a referendum was held in Denmark itself on the future of the islands, which had become both a financial burden and a strategic concern. On 17 January 1917, according to the Treaty of the Danish West Indies, the Danish government sold the islands to the United States for $25 million ($ in current prices), when the United States and Denmark exchanged their respective treaty ratifications. Danish administration ended on 31 March 1917, when the United States took formal possession of the territory and renamed it the United States Virgin Islands.

The United States had been interested in the islands since at least the 1860s. The United States finally acted in 1917 because of the islands' strategic position near the approach to the Panama Canal and because of a fear that Germany might seize them to use as U-boat bases during World War I.

At the time of the U.S. purchase of the Danish West Indies in 1917, the colony did not include Water Island, which had been sold by Denmark to the East Asiatic Company, a private shipping company, in 1905. The company eventually sold the island to the United States in 1944, during the German occupation of Denmark.

Postage stamps

St Thomas was a hub of the West Indies packet trade from 1851 to 1885. Denmark issued stamps for the Danish West Indies from 1856 onward.

Religion
The Danish West Indies were inhabited by many different cultures, and each had its own traditions and religions. The king and the church worked closely together to maintain law and order; the church was responsible for people's moral upbringing, and the king led the civil order. There was no state-sponsored religion in Denmark until 1849, but in the Danish West Indies there had always been a great deal of religious freedom. Danish authorities tended to be lenient towards religious beliefs, but required that all citizens had to observe Danish holidays. Freedom of religion was partially granted to help settle the islands, as there was a shortage of willing settlers from Europe. This worked to an extent, seeing that a large proportion of settlers were in fact Dutch and British natives fleeing religious persecution.

Jews began settling the colony in 1655, and by 1796 the first synagogue was inaugurated. In its heyday in the mid-19th century, the Jewish community made up half of the white population. One of the earliest colonial governors, Gabriel Milan, was a Sephardic Jew.

In spite of a general tolerance for religion, many African religions were not recognized because they typically revolved around belief in animism and magic, beliefs that were consistently met with scorn, and were regarded as immoral and subservient. A widespread viewpoint was that if one could convert slaves to Christianity, they could have a better life, and therefore many slaves were converted.

By 1900, with a population of 30,000, a fourth of the people were Roman Catholics, while most of the rest were Anglicans, Moravians, or other Protestants. For decades, the Moravians had organized missions and also taken charge of the educational system.

Slavery

Chattel slavery was practiced in the Danish West Indies from at least the 1670s until the abolition of slavery in 1848. Most slaves worked on plantations, particularly in sugar production, though some also worked at the harbors.

Demographics

Slaves outnumbered whites on all islands, often by large margins. On Saint Thomas, population expansion was recorded as 422 blacks and 317 whites in 1688, 555 blacks and 383 whites in 1699, and 3,042 blacks and 547 whites in 1715 (a ratio of more than 5:1), and by 1755 slaves outnumbered whites 12:1. On Saint John, there were 677 blacks and 123 whites in 1728, 1086 blacks and 208 whites in 1733 (a ratio of more than 5:1), and by 1770 slaves outnumbered whites 19:1. On Saint Croix in 1797, there were 25,452 slaves and 2,223 whites (a ratio of more than 11:1) as well as 1,164 freedmen, and in 1815 there were 24,330 slaves and 180 whites (a ratio of more than 135:1) as well as 2,480 freedmen. At that time, freedmen (many of whom had purchased their freedom) also outnumbered whites on Saint Thomas and Saint John.

Slave trade

Trading African slaves was part of the transatlantic slave trade by Denmark–Norway around 1671, when the Danish West India Company was chartered, until 1 January 1803, when the 1792 law to abolish the slave trade came into effect.

By 1778, it was estimated that the Danes were bringing about 3,000 Africans to the Danish West Indies yearly for enslavement. These transports continued until the end of 1802, when a 1792 law by Crown Prince Regent Frederik that banned the trade of slaves came into effect.

Slave codes

Laws and regulations in the Danish West Indies were based on Denmark's laws, but the local government was allowed to adapt them to match local conditions. For example, things like animals, land, and buildings were regulated according to Danish law, but Danish law did not regulate slavery. Slaves were treated as common property, and therefore did not necessitate specific laws.

In 1733, differentiation between slaves and other property was implied by a regulation that stated that slaves had their own will and thus could behave inappropriately or be disobedient. There was a general consensus that if the slaves were punished too hard or were malnourished, the slaves would start to rebel. This was borne out by the 1733 slave insurrection on St. John, where many plantation owners and their families were killed by the Akwamu, including Breffu, before it was suppressed later the following year. In 1755 Frederick V of Denmark issued more new Regulations, in which slaves were guaranteed the right not to be separated from their children and the right to medical support during periods of illness or old age. However, the colonial government had the ability to amend laws and regulations according to local conditions, and thus the regulations were never enacted in the colony, on grounds that it was more disadvantageous than advantageous.

1733 slave insurrection

The 1733 slave insurrection on St. John, which lasted from November 1733 until August 1734, was one of the earliest and longest slave rebellions in the Americas. The insurrection started on 23 November 1733, when 150 slaves, primarily Akwamus, revolted against plantation owners and managers. The slaves captured the fort in Coral Bay and took control of most of the island.

Planters regained control by the end of May 1734, after the Akwamu were defeated by several hundred better-armed French and Swiss troops sent in April from Martinique, a French colony. Colony militia continued to hunt down maroons and finally declared the rebellion at an end in late August 1734.

Emancipation

By the 1830s and 1840s, the sugar beet industry had reduced the profitability of sugarcane. The British Slavery Abolition Act of 1833 emancipated slaves in the neighboring British West Indies, fully effective as of 1840. Abolition in the Danish West Indies was discussed, with Governor von Scholten, who had been seeking reforms since 1830, in favor of emancipation. Scholarly consensus suggests von Scholten's views were influenced by his free-colored mistress Anna Heegaard.

King Christian VIII supported the gradual abolition of slavery and ruled in 1847 that every child born of an unfree woman should be free from birth, and that slavery would end entirely after 12 years. That ruling satisfied neither the slaves nor the plantation owners.

Meanwhile, on 27 April 1848, France signed a law to abolish slavery in their colonies within two months, but a slave insurrection on Martinique led to immediate abolition on Martinique on 22 May and Guadeloupe on 27 May.

The slaves in the Danish West Indies did not want to wait for their freedom, either. On 2 July 1848, freedman John Gottlieb (also known as "Moses Gottlieb" or "General Buddhoe") and Admiral Martin King (among others) led a slave rebellion, taking over Frederiksted, Saint Croix. That evening, hundreds of slaves gathered peaceably outside Fort Frederik refusing to work the next day and demanding freedom. By 10 a.m. the following morning, about 8,000 slaves had joined.

On the afternoon of 3 July 1848 (now known as Emancipation Day), Peter von Scholten, in order to end the rebellion and prevent bloodshed and damages, went to Frederiksted and announced an immediate and total emancipation of all slaves. He then went to Christiansted, where a second rebellion had formed and some fires had been set, and had notices disseminated to the other islands. General Buddhoe worked with the governor and other officials to end the riots and violence that had broken out on a few estates.

In the aftermath, Buddhoe is said to have been jailed and exiled to Trinidad. Governor von Scholten also fared poorly. As governor, he did not actually have the authority to end slavery, but had found himself in a situation where he needed to take immediate action that could not wait for communicating with Denmark. For his actions, he was called back to Denmark to face a trial for treason. He was first denied his pension, but later cleared of the charges.

When Denmark abolished slavery in 1848, many plantation owners wanted full reimbursement on the grounds that their assets were damaged by the loss of the slaves, and by the fact that they would have to pay for labor in the future. The Danish government paid fifty dollars for every slave the plantation owners had owned and recognized that the slaves' release had caused a financial loss for the owners.

Post-slavery

The lives of the formerly enslaved people changed very little because many continued to be bound to the plantation system through contractual servitude. Most were bound to serve the plantations where they had previously been enslaved. As employees, former slaves were not the plantation owners' responsibility and did not receive food or care from their employers. As part of a sharecropping system, some formerly enslaved people received a small hut, a little land, and some money; however, this one-time compensation did not change the harsh working conditions.

The Fireburn labor riot, considered to be the largest labor revolt in Danish colonial history, took place on October 1, 1878. The revolt began because the formerly enslaved continued to live and work in slave-like conditions even though three decades had passed since the abolition of slavery. Mary Leticia Thomas, today referred to as Queen Mary of St. Croix, spearheaded the revolt alongside three other women: Axeline ‘Agnes’ Elizabeth Salomon, Matilde McBean and Susanna ‘Bottom Belly’ Abrahamsson. The Fireburn uprising and its leaders continue to have a meaningful role in St. Croix.

2017 marked the 100th anniversary of the sale of the colony by Denmark to the United States. With this centennial, conversations on the legacy of Danish–Norwegian colonization and slavery were reignited in the Scandinavian mainstream. For example, the artists Jeannette Ehlers and La Vaughn Belle unveiled Denmark's first statue of a black woman, I Am Queen Mary, to memorialize Denmark's colonial impact.

See also

 Kingdom of Denmark
 Denmark
 Greenland
 Faroe Islands
 List of governors of the Danish West Indies
 1868 Danish West Indies status referendum
 1916 Danish West Indies status referendum
 1916 Danish West Indian Islands sale referendum
 Danish India
 Danish Gold Coast
 Danish slave trade

Notes

References

Further reading
 Andersen, Astrid Nonbo. ""We Have Reconquered the Islands": Figurations in Public Memories of Slavery and Colonialism in Denmark 1948–2012." International Journal of Politics, Culture, and Society 26, no. 1 (2013): 57–76. online
 Armstrong, Douglas V., et al. "Variation in venues of slavery and freedom: interpreting the late eighteenth-century cultural landscape of St. John, Danish West Indies using an archaeological GIS." International Journal of Historical Archaeology 13.1 (2009): 94–111.
 Blaagaard, Bolette B. "Whose freedom? whose memories? commemorating Danish colonialism in St. Croix." Social Identities 17.1 (2011): 61–72.
 Christensen, Rasmus. "‘Against the Law of God, of nature and the secular world’: conceptions of sovereignty in early colonial St. Thomas, 1672–1680." Scandinavian Journal of History (2021): 1–17.
 Gøbel, Erik. "Danish trade to the West Indies and Guinea, 1671–1754." Scandinavian Economic History Review 31.1 (1983): 21–49. online
 Green-Pedersen, Sv E. "The scope and structure of the Danish Negro slave trade." Scandinavian Economic History Review 19.2 (1971): 149–197. online
 Hall, Neville A. T. "Maritime maroons: grand marronage from the Danish West Indies." in Origins of the Black Atlantic (Routledge, 2013) pp. 55–76. online
 Hall, Neville A. T. "Slave laws of the Danish Virgin Islands in the later eighteenth century." Annals of the New York Academy of Sciences 292.1 (1977): 174–186.
 Hall, Neville A. T. "Anna Heegaard – Enigma." Caribbean Quarterly 22.2–3 (1976): 62–73. online
 Hvid, Mirjam Louise. "Indentured servitude and convict labour in the Danish–Norwegian West Indies, 1671–1755." Scandinavian Journal of History 41.4–5 (2016): 541–564.
 
 Mulich, Jeppe. "Microregionalism and intercolonial relations: the case of the Danish West Indies, 1730–1830." Journal of Global History 8.1 (2013): 72–94. online
 Odewale, Alicia, H. Thomas Foster, and Joshua M. Torres. "In Service to a Danish King: Comparing the Material Culture of Royal Enslaved Afro-Caribbeans and Danish Soldiers at the Christiansted National Historic Site." Journal of African Diaspora Archaeology and Heritage 6.1 (2017): 19–54.
 Richards, Helen. "Distant garden: Moravian missions and the culture of slavery in the Danish West Indies, 1732–1848." Journal of Moravian History (2007): 55–74. online
 Roopnarine, Lomarsh. "Contract labor migration as an agent of revolutionary change in the Danish West Indies." Labor History 61.5–6 (2020): 692–705.
 Roopnarine, Lomarsh. Indian Indenture in the Danish West Indies, 1863–1873 (Springer, 2016).
 Simonsen, Gunvor. "Sovereignty, Mastery, and Law in the Danish West Indies, 1672–1733." Itinerario 43.2 (2019): 283–304.
 Simonsen, Gunvor. Slave Stories: Law, Representation, and Gender in the Danish West Indies. (ISD LLC, 2017) online.
 Sircar, Kumar K. "Emigration of Indian Indentured Labour to the Danish West Indian Island of St. Croix 1863–68." Scandinavian Economic History Review 19.2 (1971): 133–148. online

External links

 The Danish West-Indies, a primary source search portal maintained by the Danish National Archives.
 World Statesman
 Transfer Day. From the website of Denmark's consulate on Virgin Islands on the transfer of the Virgin Islands from Denmark to the United States in 1917.
 Reminiscences of a 46 years' residence in the island of St. Thomas, in the West Indies, by Johan Peter Nissen, (1838), a history of the Danish West Indies from 1792 to 1838.

 
Colonial government in the West Indies
Virgin Islands
West Indies
Former colonies in North America
Former countries in the Caribbean
West Indies, Danish
History of the Caribbean
History of the United States Virgin Islands
States and territories established in 1754
States and territories disestablished in 1917
1754 establishments in the Danish colonial empire
1917 disestablishments in North America
Slavery in Denmark